The 2001 Men's European Volleyball Championship Qualification was the qualifying event for the 22nd edition of the event, hosted in Ostrava, Czech Republic from September 8 to September 16, 2001 and organised by Europe's governing volleyball body, the European Volleyball Confederation. The matches were played in the spring of 2000. The number one to six from the 1999 edition of the Men's European Volleyball Championship — Italy, Yugoslavia, Russia, France, Czech Republic (also host) and the Netherlands — were automatically qualified for the 2001 edition. The four group winners qualified, and the two best numbers two.

Group A

|}

Group B

Group C

Group D

References
 CEV Results
 Results

Q
E
E
Qualification for volleyball competitions
2001 in Czech sport
International volleyball competitions hosted by the Czech Republic